Stefanos Granitsas (1880–1915) was a Greek writer and a journalist. His work was historical, about folklore, literature, sociology, and theatre.

Stefanos was born in Granitsa, Evrytania in 1880. He wrote several papers of the time, stories and others from his hometown. He wrote for Chronos, Estia and Patris newspapers.

Granitsas fought as a sublieutenant in the Balkan Wars of 1912 and 1913.

Among his works were many poems, the theatrical work Mitroussis and The Wild and the Day of the Mountains and the Hills, a book of stories from the folklore traditions of the area related to animals.

He died in Athens in 1915.

External links
Granitsa Evrytanias

1880 births
1915 deaths
People from Evrytania
20th-century Greek male writers
Greek military personnel of the Balkan Wars